Phillip Hui (born November 17, 1987) is an American professional poker player from San Antonio, Texas and the winner of the $50,000 Poker Players Championship at the 2019 World Series of Poker.

Hui played golf at the University of Texas-San Antonio and professionally before turning to poker.

At the 2014 World Series of Poker, Hui won his first bracelet in a $3,000 Omaha Hi-Lo event, earning $286,000. In 2019, he defeated Josh Arieh heads-up to win the Poker Players Championship. The first prize of $1,099,311 was the largest of his career.

World Series of Poker bracelets

References

External links
WSOP.com profile
Hendon Mob profile

1987 births
American poker players
World Series of Poker bracelet winners
People from San Antonio
Living people